Suzanne Lenglen defeated Kitty McKane in the final, 6–1 6–2 to win the women's singles tennis title at the 1925 French Championships. This was the first time that the French Championships was staged as a Grand Slam event.

Seeds

Draw

Finals

Top half

Section 1

Section 2

The nationality of Survana is unknown.

Bottom half

Section 3

Section 4

References

External links

1925 in tennis
1925
1925 in French women's sport
1925 in French tennis